Anna Atthige is a 1974 Indian Kannada-language film, directed by M. R. Vittal and produced by M. R. Srinivas. The film stars K. S. Ashwath, Pandari Bai, Vishnuvardhan and Bharathi. The films musical score was composed by G. K. Venkatesh.

Plot

Cast

K. S. Ashwath as Siddappa
Pandari Bai as Annapoorna
Vishnuvardhan as Ravi
Bharathi Vishnuvardhan as Hema
Ramgopal as Shailendra
B. V. Radha as Shobha
Balakrishna as Chandru
M. N. Lakshmi Devi as Lakshmi
Dwarakish as Shyam
Tiger Prabhakar as a thief
Prameela
Shani Mahadevappa
Rajashree as Mamatha, Siddappa's daughter (credited as Baby Rajashree)
Sampath as Hema's father (cameo)

Soundtrack
The music was composed by G. K. Venkatesh.

References

External links
 

1974 films
1970s Kannada-language films
Films scored by G. K. Venkatesh